Albert Wilkes (6 September 1875 – 9 December 1936) was an English sports photographer and footballer in the early years of professional football in England, who played for Aston Villa from August 1898 to July 1907. Before playing for Villa he played for West Bromwich Albion and Walsall.

The Villa News and Record 1 September 1906

Wilkes instantly experienced success at Villa Park, playing a bit part in the club's 1898–99 title success before establishing himself as a first team regular in their 1899–1900 title victory. He was less fortunate in the FA cup where he found himself part of a Villa side beaten in a famous cup upset by Southern League Millwall Athletic.

He made five appearances for England, between March 1901 and May 1902, scoring the equalizing goal against Scotland in a 2–2 draw at Villa Park on 3 May 1902 – this was the replay of the match that was abandoned as a result of the first Ibrox disaster on 5 April 1902, in which 25 people died and 517 were injured.

He began his photographic career whilst still a player and he continued until his death. His son Albert Wilkes Junior continued the business until it was sold to leading photographic agency Colorsport in 1970.

References
Albert Wilkes Bio at Aston Villa Player Database
Albert Wilkes Profile at England Football Online

External links

1875 births
1936 deaths
Footballers from Birmingham, West Midlands
English footballers
England international footballers
Aston Villa F.C. players
Walsall F.C. players
West Bromwich Albion F.C. players
Association football midfielders